The water polo competition at the 2018 Central American and Caribbean Games was held in Barranquilla, Colombia from 26 July to 2 August at the Complejo Acuático.

Medal summary

Medal table

Qualification

Men's qualification

Women's qualification

Men's tournament
All times are local (UTC−5).

Group stage

Group A

Group B

Knockout stage

Bracket

Quarterfinals

5–8th place semifinals

Semifinals

Seventh place game

Fifth place game

Third place game

Final

Final ranking

Women's tournament

Group stage
All times are local (UTC−5).

Knockout stage

Bracket

Quarterfinals

Fifth place game

Semifinals

Third place game

Final

Final ranking

References

External links
2018 Central American and Caribbean Games – Water polo
Results book

2018 Central American and Caribbean Games events
Central American and Caribbean Games
2018
Qualification tournaments for the 2019 Pan American Games